Franklin Menges (October 26, 1858 – May 12, 1956) was a Republican member of the U.S. House of Representatives from Pennsylvania.

Franklin Menges was born at Menges Mills, York County, Pennsylvania. He attended Baugher Academy Preparatory School in Hanover, Pennsylvania, and graduated from Gettysburg College in 1886.

He became an instructor in chemistry and physics at Gettysburg College from 1886 to 1896, and then head of the science department of York High School from 1897 to 1903. He was a lecturer at farmers' institutes in Pennsylvania and other states from 1898 to 1918, and represented the Pennsylvania Department of Agriculture at the Louisiana Purchase Exposition at the World's Fair in 1904.  He made a soil survey of the State of Pennsylvania, and was the author of numerous articles on scientific agriculture.  In 1914, his book, Soils of Pennsylvania was published.

Menges was elected as a Republican to the Sixty-ninth, Seventieth, and Seventy-first Congresses. He was an unsuccessful candidate for reelection in 1930.

He was engaged in agricultural pursuits on his farm near York, Pennsylvania, until his retirement in 1947.  He moved to Arlington, Virginia, where he died; interred at Evergreen Cemetery, Gettysburg, Pennsylvania.

Sources

The Political Graveyard

1858 births
1956 deaths
People from York County, Pennsylvania
People from Arlington County, Virginia
Gettysburg College alumni
Burials at Evergreen Cemetery (Adams County, Pennsylvania)
Virginia Republicans
Republican Party members of the United States House of Representatives from Pennsylvania
Educators from Pennsylvania